Anders Gundersen (born 10 April 1994) is a Norwegian professional footballer who plays as a goalkeeper for Skeid.

Playing career

Club
Anders Gundersen was born in Porsgrunn, but grew up in Stathelle and started his senior career with Pors Grenland in the 2. divisjon. He signed for Strømsgodset in the summer transfer window of 2013, after impressing in a match against Strømsgodset 2.

Gundersen was part of the 2013 Tippeliga winning squad, but did not play any matches. He got his first team debut for Strømsgodset on 19 May 2014 in the 1-2 loss to Stabæk. He also played the next two matches for Strømsgodset, when first choice goalkeeper Adam Larsen Kwarasey was participating in the 2014 FIFA World Cup.

On 21 July 2015, Gundersen went on loan to Sandefjord for the remainder of the season. In December 2015, the loan was extended to the end of the 2016-season.

International
Gundersen was called up to the Norway U-19 team in 2013.

Career statistics

Honours

Club 
 Strømsgodset
 Tippeligaen champion: 2013

References

External links 

1994 births
Living people
People from Bamble
Sportspeople from Porsgrunn
Norwegian footballers
Association football goalkeepers
Pors Grenland players
Strømsgodset Toppfotball players
Sandefjord Fotball players
Eliteserien players
Norwegian First Division players
Arendal Fotball players
Moss FK players